This is a list of launches made by the Black Brant sounding rocket.

See also

Black Brant (rocket)

External links
Encyclopedia Astronautica - Black Brant

Bla